Viktor Germanovich Kazantsev (26 February 1946 – 14 September 2021) was an envoy of the Russian president to the Southern Federal District from 2000 to 2004. He performed primary negotiations between the Russian government and the Chechen opposition. Decorated with the Hero of the Russian Federation title, he was involved in coordinating the government responses to various violent actions in Chechnya. Kazanstev was also involved in coordinating the rescue attempt during the Moscow theatre hostage situation, which took place in October 2002.

Education

Military service

Soviet Union
Kazantsev began his career as a platoon commander in 1966 and served in Transcaucasia, Central Asia, Afghanistan (1979) and with the Central Group of Forces in  Czechoslovakia. He was military advisor to the government of Kazakhstan in 1991.

Russia
From 1991 to 1993, Kazantsev was First Deputy Chief of Staff, and then deputy commander of the Transbaikal Military District for combat training. From April 1993 to February 1996 he was Chief of Staff and first deputy commander of the Transbaikal Military District. From February 1996 to July 1997 he was First Deputy Commander of the North Caucasus Military District, and then from July 1997 to May 2000 Commander of the North Caucasus Military District.

From August 1999 to April 2000, Kazantsev was Commander of the Allied Group of Federal Forces in the North Caucasus, while maintaining the post of commander of the North Caucasus Military District. In January 2001, he became a member of the Operational Headquarters for the management of counterterrorism actions in the North Caucasus region, created by decree of the President of the Russian Federation.

Political activity
In May 2000, Kazantsev was appointed the President's representative to Russia's Southern Federal District. On 9 March 2004, he was dismissed from this post and replaced by former Deputy Prime Minister Vladimir Yakovlev.

Honours and awards

Soviet Union
 Order of the Red Star
 Order for Service to the Homeland in the Armed Forces of the USSR 2nd and 3rd classes
 Medal for Battle Merit
 Jubilee Medal "In Commemoration of the 100th Anniversary since the Birth of Vladimir Il'ich Lenin"
 Jubilee Medal "Twenty Years of Victory in the Great Patriotic War 1941-1945"
 Medal "Veteran of the Armed Forces of the USSR"
 Jubilee Medal "50 Years of the Armed Forces of the USSR"
 Jubilee Medal "60 Years of the Armed Forces of the USSR"
 Jubilee Medal "70 Years of the Armed Forces of the USSR"
 Medal "For Impeccable Service" 1st, 2nd and 3rd classes

Russian Federation
 Hero of the Russian Federation
 Order of Military Merit
 Jubilee Medal "300 Years of the Russian Navy"
 Medal "In Commemoration of the 850th Anniversary of Moscow"

Sources
This article is sourced from Russian Wikipedia

1946 births
2021 deaths
People from Talachyn District
Generals of the army (Russia)
Heroes of the Russian Federation
Recipients of the Order "For Service to the Homeland in the Armed Forces of the USSR", 2nd class
Recipients of the Order of Military Merit (Russia)
Recipients of the Order of Friendship (South Ossetia)
Frunze Military Academy alumni
Military Academy of the General Staff of the Armed Forces of the Soviet Union alumni